Celia Hart (January 4, 1962 – September 7, 2008) was a Cuban physicist and writer. Until May 2006, she was a member of the Cuban Communist Party.  She was the daughter of two historic leaders of the Cuban Revolution, Haydee Santamaría and Armando Hart.

Overview
Since 2003, many of her writings have been translated into English by CubaNews. Its editor, Walter Lippmann, is also editor of It's never too late to love or rebel, the English-language collection of Hart's writings. According to that book, she has described herself as a 'freelance Trotskyist' since discovering Leon Trotsky's writings when she was studying in East Germany in the 1980s. According to the editors of Socialist Resistance, "at that time she could see at first hand that this so-called 'actually existing socialism' was a society in decadence and without a future."

Hart died in a car accident in Havana on September 7, 2008. Her older brother Abel also died in the same car accident.

References

External links
 Celia Hart Santamaria Internet Archive
 Biographical note
 Selected writings 2003-2007 (in English)
 Selected writings 2003-2005 (in Spanish)
 Blog about Celia's English-language book
 Fidel from my balcony
 Celia Hart Santamaría (1963 – 2008) Obituary by Alan Woods
Celia Hart Santamaría at the Marxist Internet Archive

1962 births
2008 deaths
Cuban Trotskyists
Cuban people of American descent
Road incident deaths in Cuba